A tassel is a finishing feature in fabric decoration.

Tassel may also refer to:
Male inflorescence of maize. 
Tassel flower
Tassel fern
Tzitzit, sometimes translated as "tassels"
Sword knot
Hôtel Tassel, a UNESCO World Heritage house in Brussels, Belgium
Tassel (surname)